Emily DiDonato (born February 24, 1991) is an American model.

Early life

Born in Goshen, New York, DiDonato is of Italian, Irish, and Native American ancestry. Her great-grandparents emigrated to the U.S. from Italy. Emily was scouted at the Danbury Mall when she was 10 years old by Tina Kiniry from the John Casablancas Modeling & Acting Agency of Connecticut.  Tina introduced Emily to Request Model Management in 2008 and she booked jobs as the face of Guess? clothing for spring 2009 and as a model in Ralph Lauren's "Rugby" spring 2009 advertisement campaign.

Career

In May 2009, she was signed as the face of Maybelline New York, having just graduated from high school with only a few months of modeling experience, and made her television commercial debut for the company's "Color Sensational Lip Color" line, alongside Christy Turlington, Jessica White, and Julia Stegner.  DiDonato began modeling for Victoria's Secret in August 2009, and appeared on her first magazine cover with The Block's October 2009 issue.

Prior to the 2009 New York Fashion Week, Vogue Germany dubbed her "top newcomer".

In 2010, she became the face of Giorgio Armani's fragrance Acqua Di Gioia. Images of her from this campaign were used as the cover pages of L'Oréal's Annual and Financial Reports for 2010. For Summer 2013, Emily DiDonato stars in advertising campaign for Oysho.

She made her Sports Illustrated Swimsuit Issue debut in 2013, with photos taken in Namibia.

Emily has walked for Chanel, Balmain, Givenchy, rag+bone, Louis Vuitton, Loewe, and Giles Deacon.

She has appeared in advertising campaigns for Miu Miu, Oscar de la Renta, Giorgio Armani, Calvin Klein, Trussardi, Ralph Lauren, Just Cavalli, Missoni, Elie Tahari, Longchamp, Nicole Farhi, Aldo, Gap, Juicy Couture, and Guess.

DiDonato has stated that "I'd like to maybe get into acting one day."

Personal life
DiDonato married financier Kyle Peterson on June 23, 2018. In June 2021, DiDonato announced her pregnancy with a baby girl. She gave birth on November 23, 2021. In October 2022, DiDonato announced her second pregnancy.

References

External links
 
 
 Vogue's "The Scene": The September Issue premier gallery

1991 births
Living people
American people of Italian descent
American people of Irish descent
Female models from New York (state)
IMG Models models
People from Goshen, New York
American people who self-identify as being of Native American descent
21st-century American women